Mohan Chandra Naskar   is an Indian politician member of All India Trinamool Congress.  He is an MLA, elected from the  Satgachhia  constituency in the 2021 West Bengal Legislative Assembly election.

References 

Trinamool Congress politicians from West Bengal
Living people
People from South 24 Parganas district
West Bengal MLAs 2021–2026
Year of birth missing (living people)